Agba Otikpo Mézodé is a politician and diplomat from the Central African Republic. Otikpo Mézodé was named foreign minister of his country on 5 April 2001 in Martin Ziguélé government alongside finance minister Eric Sorongopé and Interior Minister Théodore Bikoo. He left office in 2003.

References

Year of birth missing (living people)
Living people
Central African Republic diplomats
Government ministers of the Central African Republic
Foreign ministers of the Central African Republic